See also: Saturday Night Live TV show sketches, listed alphabetically, listed chronologically.

The following are the most frequent recurring characters and celebrity impressions on Saturday Night Live listed by cast member.

A

Fred Armisen

Barack Obama
Billiam, from Gays in Space (2005–06)
Billy Smith (2003–04)
David Paterson
Fericito, often featured in ¡Show Biz Grande Explosion! (2002–05)
Frondi, a man who says whatever is on his mind
Gabe Fisher, a member of the Adult Students (2003)
Garth, of holiday singing duo "Garth & Kat" (2009–15)
Gunther Kelly, one of The Kelly Brothers (2003–06)
Henry Quincy Lundford of The Lundford Twins Feel Good Variety Hour (2005)
Leonard, co-host of "Club Traxx" (2003)
Mackey, the elderly drummer from Rialto Grande (2003)
Nicholas Fehn, a political comedian who never has a point (2007–12)
Nuni Schoener (2005–07)
One of the "Two Gay Guys from..." (2006–12)
Prince (2004–12)
Roger Brush, a women's advice talk show producer who often fills in for the female host and ends up giving bad advice (2009–12)
Steve Jobs
Willie Tater from Appalachian Emergency Room (2004)
Randy Newman
Stuart from "The Californians"

Dan Aykroyd

Beldar Conehead (1977–79)
Bob Dole
Bob Widette (1978)
E. Buzz Miller (1977)
Elwood Blues of The Blues Brothers (1976–78)
Floyd Hunger, from The Mall sketches
Fred Garvin, Male Prostitute
George, one of the cooks at Olympia Cafe
Irwin Mainway from Consumer Probe and other sketches (1976–)
Jack Neehauser from St. Mickey's Knights of Columbus (1978)
Jimmy Carter (1977–79)
Jimmy Joe Red Sky, from Nick The Lounge Singer sketches
Joe, one of The Ex-Police
Julia Child
Leonard Pinth-Garnell (1977–79)
Mel of Mel's Char Palace (1975)
Mike Mendoza
Ray the Telepsychic
Richard Nixon (1975–79)
Robert Stack
Rod Serling
Sheriff Brady, in the "Land Shark" sketches
Tom Snyder
Vincent Price
Yortuk Festrunck (1977)

B

Vanessa Bayer

Jacob the Bar Mitzvah Boy
Hillary Clinton
Kourtney Kardashian
Miley Cyrus
Rebecca Stern-Markowitz-san from J-Pop America Fun Time Now (2011–)

Jim Belushi

Captain Kangaroo
Hank Rippy, host of "Hello Trudy!" (1983)
Jesse Donnelly
That White Guy (1985)

John Belushi

Elizabeth Taylor
Frank Leary, from St. Mickey's Knights of Columbus (1978)
Fred Silverman
Henry Kissinger
Jake Blues of The Blues Brothers (1976–78)
Jeff Widette (1978)
Joe Cocker
Kevin from The Mall sketches
Kuldroth from Coneheads sketches
Larry Farber
Lowell Brock from H & L Brock (1976)
Marlon Brando
Matt Hooper, in the "Land Shark" sketches
Pete, owner of the Olympia Cafe
Samurai Futaba (1976–79)
Steve Bushakis (1976)
The Hulk
Truman Capote

Beck Bennett 

 Mike Pence
 Vladimir Putin
Jules, Who Sees Things a Little Differently, on Weekend Update
Casey from Inside SoCal
 Jake Tapper
 Mitch McConnell

Jim Breuer

Don Wong of Wong & Owens, Ex-Porn Stars (1997)
Glenn, the jock brother of Azrael Abyss on Goth Talk
Goat Boy (1996)
Gunner Olsen, heavy metal singer (1998)
Jeffrey Kaufman, host of Issues with Jeffrey Kaufman (1997)
Jim Lehrer
Joe Pesci
Joe, Jr., son of Joe Blow (1995)

Paul Brittain

Harry Reid
Johnny Depp
James Franco
"Sex" Ed Vincent
Lord Wyndemere

A. Whitney Brown

Host of "The Big Picture" on Weekend Update
Ed Jaymes

Aidy Bryant 

 William Barr
 Sarah Huckabee Sanders
Travel expert Carrie Krum on Weekend Update

C

Beth Cahill

Denise Swerski, daughter of Bob Swerski in Bill Swerski's Superfans (1991)
Marcia Brady
Pam, of the "Delta Delta Delta" sorority (1992)

Dana Carvey

The Church Lady  (1986–2011)
A Grumpy Old Man (1989)
Bob Dylan
Buddy Precisely, the snobby Maitre'D in "Celebrity Restaurant" (1988)
Casey Kasem
Ching Chang (1986)
Chris, Pat's love interest
Dennis Miller
Derek Stevens (1986)
Garth Algar from Wayne's World (1988–2015)
George F. Will
George H. W. Bush (1989–93)
George Michael
Hans (1987)
Johnny Carson
Jimmy Stewart
Lane Maxwell
Larry Roman (1990)
Lyle Billup, the Effeminate Heterosexual (1989)
Lyle Clark from Toonces the Driving Cat (1989)
Marco, one of The Kitchen Boys
Massive Headwound Harry
Mickey Rooney
Mishu from Miss Connie's Fable Nook (1986)
One of the Elevator Fans (1991)
One of the Two Sammies (1986)
Paul McCartney
Regis Philbin
Robin Leach
Ross Perot
Strom Thurmond
Ted Koppel
Tom Brokaw

Chevy Chase

Gregg Allman
Gerald Ford (1975–76)
Land Shark (1975–82)
Leonard Nimoy

Ellen Cleghorne

Jackée Harry
Joycelyn Elders
Pop's Daughter, in "Tales From The Barbecue" (1991)
Queen Shenequa (1991)
Robin Quivers
Tina Turner
Whoopi Goldberg
Zoraida the NBC Page

Billy Crystal

 Buddy Young, Jr. (1984)
 Fernando of Fernando's Hideaway (1984)
 Joe Franklin
 Lew Goldman (1984)
 Ricky of Ricky & Phil (1985)
 Sammy Davis, Jr.
 Willie of Willie & Frankie (1984)

Jane Curtin

Barbara, friend of Rhonda Weiss (1977)
Betty Ford
Betty Widette (1978)
Enid Loopner, Lisa Loopner's mother (1979)
Iris de Flaminio (1980)
Joan Face, Heavy Sarcasm sketch (1979)
Miss Hathaway from The Bel-Airabs (1979–80)
Pat Nixon
Prymaat Conehead (1977–79)

Joan Cusack

Brooke Shields
Salena of The Further Adventures of Biff and Salena (1986)

D

Pete Davidson 

 Chad
 Michael Avenatti

Tom Davis

The Franken and Davis Show (1978)

Mikey Day 

 Donald Trump Jr.

Denny Dillon

Amy Carter
Debbie of Vickie & Debbie (1980)
Mary Louise, a mentally disturbed child who talked to her sock puppet, Sam the Snake
Pinky Waxman of The Waxmans
Yoko Ono

Robert Downey, Jr.

Jimmy Chance, co-host of "Actors on Film"
Rudy Randolph of The Rudy Randolphs (1985)

Rachel Dratch

Abe Scheinwald (2003–05)
Anne Robinson
Debbie Downer (2005–20)
Denise McDenna, one of the Boston Teens (1999–11)
Elizabeth Taylor
Harry Potter
Julie, the lady who always speaks in the "Telephone Operator Voice"
Loretta, leader of the "Space Lesbians" in Gays in Space
Lynne Bershad from Delicious Dish (2000)
Nicole, the Girl With No Gay-Dar!
One of the cocktail waitresses in Rialto Grande (2003)
One of the dancers in the Lundford Twins Feel Good Variety Hour (2005)
Phoebe of Phoebe and her Giant Pets(2004)
Qrplt*xk, the drooling mutant with the baby arm growing from its head
Ruth Weinstock, one of the Adult Students (2003)
Sheldon from Wake Up Wakefield! (2001)
Virginia Klarvin, one of The Lovers

Robin Duke

Mrs. T (1982)
Paulette Clooney (1981)
Wendy Whiner (1982–84)

Nora Dunn

Ashley Ashley (1986)
Babette (1986)
Denise Venetti, host of Learning To Feel (1988)
Liz Sweeney, of The Sweeney Sisters (1986)
Loose Chang, wife of Ching Chang (1986)
Mrs. Campbell, Wayne Campbell's mom
Pat Stevens (1985)

E

Dean Edwards
Don Cheadle
Michael Jackson
Chris Tucker
Denzel Washington

Abby Elliott
Anna Faris
Sally Field
Angelina Jolie
Joan Cusack
Khloé Kardashian
Rachel Berry
Meryl Streep
Christina Aguilera
Rachel Maddow
Zooey Deschanel

Chris Elliott
Chris Berman
Yasser Arafat

F

Jimmy Fallon

Barry Gibb from "The Barry Gibb Talk Show" (2003–13)
Jarret (2000–04)
Joey Mack on Z105 (2002)
Kip Bloder
Nick Burns, Your Company's Computer Guy (1999–01)
One of the Jeffrey's clerks (2001)
Osama bin Laden
Pat Sullivan, one of The Boston Teens (1999–11)
Patrick Fitzwilliam, co-host of Top O' The Morning (2002)
Randy Goldman from Wake Up Wakefield! (2001)
Rodney "The Zipper" Calzoun from Rialto Grande (2003)
Señor G­alupe Juameras from The How Do You Say? Ah, Yes, Show (1998)
The Leather Man (2002)
Wade from 7 Degrees Celsius (1999)

Siobhan Fallon

Meg, of the "Delta Delta Delta" sorority (1992)
Christy, one of the co-workers in "It's Pat" (1994)
Katharine Hepburn

Chris Farley

B Fats, co-host of I'm Chillin' (1991)
Bennett Brauer (1993)
Beverly Gelfand from Zagat's
Cindy Crawford, manager of The Gap
Dom DeLuise
Drinkin' Buddy, the sidekick of Middle-Aged Man (1990)
Host of The Chris Farley Show (1991–93)
Mark Strobel (1991)
Matt Foley Motivational Speaker (1993–97)
Mr. O'Malley, friend of The Herlihy Boy (1993)
Newt Gingrich
One of the Hub's Gyros ("You like-a the juice?") guys (1993)
Sandman from The Dark Side with Nat X
Todd O'Connor, one of Bill Swerski's Superfans (1991–92)
Tom Arnold
Carnie Wilson
Meat Loaf

Will Ferrell

George W. Bush (2000–02)
Alex Trebek from Celebrity Jeopardy! (1996–2015)
Baron Nocturna from Goth Talk
Craig from The Rocky Roads (1995)
Craig Buchanan of The Spartan Cheerleaders (1995–99)
David Larry, co-host of Dog Show (1998)
Dr. Beamen a.k.a. the crazy doctor (2000)
Frank Henderson a.k.a. the Get Off The Shed! guy (1995)
Hank, one of the Bill Brasky guys (1996–2013)
Harry Caray
Jacob Silj (1999)
James Lipton from Inside the Actors Studio
Janet Reno, host of Janet Reno's Dance Party (1997–2001)
The supervisor at Jeffrey's (2001)
Leslie Attebury (1997)
Marty Culp (1996–2015)
Peter Tanner, manager of 7 Degrees Celsius (1999)
Roger Klarvin, one of the Lovers (2001–03)
Robert Goulet
Saddam Hussein
Don West, one of the Shopping at Home Network sports memorabilia guys
Sean Patrick Flannery, a classmate of Mary Katherine Gallagher
Spider from The Joe Pesci Show
Steve Butabi, one of  The Roxbury Guys (1996)
Terrence Maddox, Nude Model (1998)
Tom Wilkins, co-host of Morning Latte (1997)

Tina Fey

One of the cocktail waitresses in Rialto Grande (2003)
One of the dancers in The Lundford Twins Feel Good Variety Hour (2005)
One of the Space Lesbians in Gays in Space
Sarah Palin (2008)
Queef Latina

Will Forte

Announcer on "What Up With That?" (2009–10)
Brian Williams
Daryl Hall
George W. Bush (2004–06)
Gilly's teacher
Greg Stink, ESPN Color Commentator (2009–15)
Harry Reid
Jeff Montgomery, a very polite convicted sex offender (2008)
John Edwards
MacGruber (2007–10)
One of the dancers in The Lundford Twins Feel Good Variety Hour (2005)
One of the members of "Jon Bovi" (2006–09)
Patrick Kelly, one of The Kelly Brothers (2003–06)
The Falconer
Tim Calhoun (2002–08)
Tim Geithner
Zell Miller

Al Franken

Al Franken : Social Sciences Editor of Weekend Update
Al Goldstein
Henry Kissinger
Lyndon LaRouche
One-Man Mobile Uplink Reporter
Pat Robertson
Paul Tsongas
Stuart Smalley (1991)
The Franken and Davis Show (1978)
Senator Paul Simon

G

Heidi Gardner 

 Angel, Every Boxer's Girlfriend from Every Movie About Boxing Ever
 Bailey Gismert, a teen film critic on Weekend Update
 Baskin Johns, a Goop staffer
 Brie Bacardi
 Jill Biden

Janeane Garofalo

Hillary Clinton
Jackie Stallone
Martha Stewart

Ana Gasteyer

Bobbi Mohan-Culp (1996–2015)
Celine Dion
Cinder Calhoun (1996)
Elizabeth Dole
Helen Thomas
Joan Rivers
Joy Behar
Deana Nolan-Gray, host of Hello Dolly
Gayle Gleason, host of Pretty Living (1998)
Ginger Attebury (1997)
Gladys Stubbs from Tiger Beat's Ultra Super Duper Dreamy Love Show (1998)
Jonette from Gemini's Twin (2000)
Kincaid (1996)
Margaret Jo McCullin, cohost of Delicious Dish (1996)
Mary Faye, one of the Southern Gals (1997)
Sally Jessy Raphael
Martha Stewart

Gilbert Gottfried

Leo Waxman, Pinky Waxman's husband on What's It All About?

Mary Gross

Siobhan Cahill (1983)
Pee-Wee Herman
Dr. Ruth Westheimer
Alfalfa, of The Little Rascals
Chi Chi, of Chi Chi & Consuela (1984)

Christopher Guest

Frankie, of Willie & Frankie (1984)
Herb Minkman
Rajeev Vindaloo (1984)
Alan Barrows, one of The Folksmen (1984)
Tippi Turtle (1984)

H

Bill Hader

Stefon
Al Pacino
James Carville
Gizmo/Gremlins
Eliot Spitzer
Willem Dafoe
Alan Alda
Keith Morrison
Vincent Price
Daniel Day-Lewis
Clint Eastwood
John Mark Karr
Lindsey Buckingham
Julian Assange
Michael Richards
Eddie Vedder
Peter O'Toole
Mike The Situation
Dwayne Vogelcheck
Greg the Alien
One of the "Gay Guys from New Jersey" (2008–09)
Vinny Vedecci, the host of La Revista Di La Television Con Vinny Vedecci (2008–10)
Nitro from Laser cats (2006)
David Bowie
Charlie Sheen
Herb Welch  (2010–14)
War vet Anthony Peter Coleman in the Puppet Class sketches
Devin from The Californians (with Fred Armisen, Kristen Wiig and Vanessa Bayer)

Anthony Michael Hall
Craig Sundberg, Idiot Savant—a 15-year-old genius who was mentally retarded
Fed Jones, one half of "Two Jones" Brothers (the other brother named Ned Jones was played by Damon Wayans), two criminals who sell stolen items such as radios, bikes, purses, computers, and cable TV installation

Rich Hall
Robert Latta
David Byrne
Doug Flutie
Doug Henning
Paul Harvey
Host of the Saturday Night News Election Reports

Darrell Hammond
Bill Clinton (1995–2016)
Jesse Jackson
Donald Trump
Phil Donahue
Dick Cheney
Chris Matthews
John McCain
Al Gore
Jay Leno
Jesse Helms
Dan Rather
Ted Koppel
John Travolta
Rudy Giuliani
Tim Russert
Donald Rumsfeld
Geraldo Rivera
Bill O'Reilly
Sean Connery from Celebrity Jeopardy!
Percy Bodance from Appalachian Emergency Room
Regis Philbin
William Shatner
Arnold Schwarzenegger
Uncle Frank, co-host of "The Local News with Joe Blow"
Tarik Ozekial, co-host of "The Ferey Muhtar Talk Show"
Skeeter, a redneck who randomly appears in certain situations

Phil Hartman
Frankenstein
Unfrozen Caveman Lawyer
Chick Hazard, 1950s Private Investigator
Russell Clark, host of "Sassy's Sassiest Boys"
Beev Algar, father of Garth Algar on Wayne's World
Eugene, host of Cooking with the Anal Retentive Chef
Susan, the she-male in Sprockets
Frank Sinatra
Peter Graves
Charlton Heston
Donald Trump
Jimmy Swaggart
Jim Bakker
James Stockdale
Ronald Reagan (1986–89)
Bill Clinton (1993–94)
Ed McMahon
Liberace
Ted Kennedy
Phil Donahue
Jack Nicholson
Burt Reynolds
Pat Buchanan

Jan Hooks
Nancy Reagan
Kathie Lee Gifford
Hillary Clinton
Tammy Faye Bakker
Sinéad O'Connor
Marge Keister
Miss Connie
Nancy Simmons, in Wayne's World
Candy Sweeney, of The Sweeney Sisters

Melanie Hutsell
Jan Brady
Tori Spelling
Tonya Harding
Di, of the "Delta Delta Delta" sorority

J

Victoria Jackson
Roseanne
Cyndi Lauper
Nancy Maloney, a nightclub singer

Colin Jost 

 Pete Buttigieg

K

Chris Kattan
Kyle DeMarco from The DeMarco Brothers
Mr. Peepers
Buddy Mills, a washed-up Vegas comedian in Rialto Grande
Antonio Banderas from The How Do You Say? Ah, Yes, Show.
Mango
Gay Hitler
Al Pacino
Andy Dick
Steve Irwin
Paul Begala
Paul Shaffer
Ricky Martin
David Lee Roth
Azrael Abyss, co-host of Goth Talk
Josh Zimmerman from The Zimmermans, where he and Cheri Oteri played an inappropriately sexual married couple
Eddy Lewis, one of the Shopping at Home Network sports memorabilia guys
Gollum (from The Lord of the Rings)
Doug Butabi from The Roxbury Guys
Suel Forrester (a.k.a. "the gibberish guy")

Tim Kazurinsky
Dr. Jack Badofsky
Havnagootiim Vishnuuerheer
Wayne Huevos
Father Timothy Owens
Worthington Clotman
Husband in "I Married A Monkey"
Mr. Landlord, in Mister Robinson's Neighborhood

Laura Kightlinger
Connie Chung
Marcia Clark

Taran Killam
Michael Cera
Gilbert Gottfried
Pee-Wee Herman
Chris Pine
Finn Hudson
"What Up with That?" announcer
Brad Pitt
Eminem
Piers Morgan
Ted Cruz
Donald Trump
 Jebidiah Atkinson (Weekend Update)

David Koechner
Pat Buchanan
Mike Ditka
One of the Bill Brasky guys
Gerald "T-Bones" Tibbons, a deranged redneck who takes on different odd jobs
Gary Macdonald, the nervous joke-telling brother of Norm Macdonald
Fagan of The British Fops
Tom Taylor, neighbor who's always invited to Frank Henderson's (Will Ferrell) barbecues in the "Get Off The Shed!" sketches

Gary Kroeger
El Dorko
Dwight MacNamara
Donny Osmond
Paul Shaffer
Walter Mondale

L

Julia Louis-Dreyfus
Marie Osmond
Nina Blackwood
Consuela, of "Chi Chi & Consuela"
Yoko Ono

Jon Lovitz
Tonto
Hanukkah Harry
Annoying Man
Evelyn Quince
Harvey Fierstein
Master Thespian
Mephistopheles
Michael Dukakis
One of "The Girl Watchers"
Tommy Flanagan a.k.a. The Liar

M

Norm Macdonald
Burt Reynolds from Celebrity Jeopardy!
Bob Dole
Andy Rooney
Charles Kuralt
David Letterman
Clint Eastwood
Quentin Tarantino
Dr. Jack Kevorkian
Larry King
Marv Albert
Stan Hooper

Gail Matthius
Valley Girl Vickie, an air-headed teenager who bothers others with her vacuous questions and statements

Michael McKean
Bill Clinton (1994–95)
Jerry Palter, one of The Folksmen
Anthony, the weather guy on "Good Morning Brooklyn"
Vincent Price
Howard Stern

Mark McKinney
Steve Forbes
Paul Shaffer
Jim Carrey
Bill Gates
One of the Bill Brasky guys
Lucien of The British Fops
Ian Daglers, co-host of "Scottish Soccer Hooligan Weekly"

Kate McKinnon

Justin Bieber
Mary Berry
Kate Bolduan
Theresa Caputo
Hillary Clinton
Kellyanne Conway
Penélope Cruz
S.E. Cupp
Ellen DeGeneres
Jodie Foster
Cecilia Gimenez
Ruth Bader Ginsburg
Kris Jenner
Jane Lynch
Angela Merkel
Ann Romney
Shakira
Jeff Sessions
Greta Van Susteren
Tilda Swinton
Keith Urban
Elizabeth Warren
Rudy Giuliani
Jeff Sessions
Nancy Pelosi
Laura Ingraham
Lindsey Graham
Olya Povlatsky, a Russian woman who appears on "Weekend Update," and voices her opinions on current events
Colleen Rafferty, a woman who, along with Cecily Strong and the guest host, is describing extraordinary experiences.
Sheila Sovage, a heavily intoxicated woman at a bar at last call.
Deenie, a.k.a. "Somebody's Mom"
Barbara DeDrew, a lesbian volunteer at a Cat Shelter called Whiskers R We
Mrs. Santini, an apartment dweller who writes passive-aggressive notes to her neighbors
Debette Goldry

Tim Meadows
O. J. Simpson
Ike Turner
Michael Jackson
Oprah Winfrey
Billy Dee Williams
Sammy Davis Jr.
David Dinkins
Brad, one of "The Rocky Roads"
Pimpin Kyle, from the sketch Pimp Chat
Pop, in "Tales From The Barbecue"
G-Dog, rapper and star of "Princess and the Homeboy"
Captain Jim, of "Captain Jim and Pedro"
Leon Phelps, host of "The Ladies Man"
Chris Garnett, host of "The Quiet Storm"
Russell Johnson, of "Russell & Tate"
Lionel Osbourne, host of "Perspectives"
Jerry "Steve" Dave, "The Magic Man"
One of the Bill Brasky guys

Seth Meyers
Anderson Cooper
John Kerry
Carrot Top
Hugh Grant
Ryan Seacrest
Brian Williams
Dave "The Zinger" Clinger
Brad Scheinwald
Ty Pennington (of Extreme Makeover: Home Edition)
Boston Powers from Catchphrase Comedy Tour
Nerod, the waiting room receptionist from Appalachian Emergency Room
DJ Jonathan Feinstein
Ian Gerrard, co-anchor of Spy Glass
William Fitzpatrick, co-host of Top O' The Morning
Dan Needler

Dennis Miller
Koko the French Clown, one of the pixies from Mrs. Connie's Fable Nook
Steve, one of the Stand-Ups

Jerry Minor
Al Sharpton
Terrell, from the Jackie the security clerk sketches
Grand Master Rap, co-host of "Rap Street"

Finesse Mitchell
Stuart Scott
Donovan McNabb
Morgan Freeman
Starkisha, a stereotypical black woman

Alex Moffat 

 Anderson Cooper
 Eric Trump
Chuck Schumer
 Guy Who Just Bought a Boat on Weekend Update

Jay Mohr
Christopher Walken
Andrew McCarthy
Anthony Kiedis
Billy Idol
Dick Vitale
Don Rickles
Joe Perry
Kenny G
Mickey Rourke
Ricki Lake
Sean Penn
Tony Bennett
James Barone, host of "Good Morning Brooklyn"

Kyle Mooney
Lincoln Chafee
Criss Angel
Tom Cotton
Stand up comic Bruce Chandling, appears on Weekend Update
John Neely Kennedy
Chris Fitzpatrick, a high school student and heavy metal enthusiast
Todd from Inside SoCal

Tracy Morgan
Brian Fellow
Dominican Lou
Astronaut Jones
A.J., a member of the Adult Students
Reggie Owens, of Wong & Owens, Ex-Porn Stars
Tate Witherspoon, of "Russell & Tate"
Woodrow
Al Sharpton
Mike Tyson
Star Jones
Little Richard

Garrett Morris
Chico Esquella - Latin Baseball Player
Head master of the New York School for the hard of hearing on Weekend Update. Morris would just repeat what Chevy Chase said, but in a much louder voice.

Bobby Moynihan
Guy Fieri
Nathan Lane
Snooki
Ass Dan
Vinny Vedecci's son
The "WHAAAAT!" microphone drop guy
Liam, student in the Gilly sketches
Anthony Crispino, the second-hand news reporter
Mark Payne, the Uno's waiter/bartender
Drunk Uncle, a character on Weekend Update who rambles on about various topics while intoxicated
Chris Christie
Sam Kinison
Verne Troyer
Newt Gingrich
Sean Hannity
Susan Boyle
Rob Ford

Eddie Murphy
Gumby
Bill Cosby
James Brown
Buh-wheet (Parody of Billie "Buckwheat" Thomas)
Mr. Robinson, in Mister Robinson's Neighborhood
Velvet Jones
Little Richard Simmons

Bill Murray
Nick The Lounge Singer
Todd DiLamuca, of The Nerds
Walter Cronkite
Richard Burton
David Susskind
Dick Lanky
Brian Welles
Fernando
Honker
Ronnie Bateman
Jerry Eldini
Francis Jocko Leary Jr.
Mudhad Asad, in "The Bel Airabs"
Richard Herkiman, host of "Shower Mike"
Niko, one of the cook's at Olympia Cafe

Mike Myers
Wayne Campbell, host of Wayne's World
Dieter
Simon
Linda Richman
Middle-Aged Man
Phillip the hyper-hypo kid
Pat Arnold, one of Bill Swerski's Superfans
Lothar of the Hill People
Mick Jagger
Phil Collins
Barbra Streisand
Garth Brooks

N

Kevin Nealon
Tarzan
Sam Donaldson
Mr. Subliminal
Franz from Hans and Franz
One of the Elevator Fans
Jimmy, of "Jimmy & Frank, the Doormen"
One of Two Sammies
Frank Gannon, Politically Incorrect Private Investigator
Mr No Depth Perception

Laraine Newman
Connie Conehead
Sherry, a ditzy blonde
Amy Carter
Rosalynn Carter

Don Novello
Father Guido Sarducci
Mike, one of the cooks at Olympia Cafe

O

Michael O'Donoghue
Mr. Mike

Cheri Oteri
Arianna, one of The Spartan Cheerleaders
Laura Zimmerman from The Zimmermans, where she and Chris Kattan played an inappropriately sexual married couple
Mariah Carey
Collette Reardon
Rita Delvecchio
Nadeen a.k.a. the "Simmer Down Now!" lady
Barbara Walters
Yoko Ono

P

Chris Parnell
Mervin Watson a.k.a. Merv the Perv
Tom Brokaw
Eminem
Jim Lehrer
John McCain
Kenneth Starr
Simon Cowell
Wolf Blitzer
Thad, from Gays in Space
Daniel, one of Jarret's roommates
Often performed rap songs on Weekend Update about wanting to sleep with many of the hot female hosts
Terrye Funck, an effeminate-speaking southern man who hosts various public access programs
Tyler from Appalachian Emergency Room, a hapless redneck who gets strange objects stuck up his rectum.
One of the dancers in the Lundford Twins Feel Good Variety Hour
Jeph from 7 Degrees Celsius
Wayne Bloder
Warren Kerney, from the Three-Way couple
Tato, the shy and giggling man-servant of Schoeners
Shaun DeMarco from The DeMarco Brothers

Nasim Pedrad
Arianna Huffington
Barbara Walters
Bedelia
Kim Kardashian
Lil Blaster
M.I.A.
Michelle Malkin
Hoda Kotb
Tippy
Kelly Ripa
Sharon Osbourne
Heshy

Jay Pharoah
Jay-Z
Kanye West
Chris Tucker
Denzel Washington
Eddie Murphy
Will Smith
Stephen A. Smith
Shaquille O'Neal
50 Cent
Usher
Lil Wayne
Katt Williams
Lamar Odom
Barack Obama
Ben Carson
Shannon Sharpe

Joe Piscopo
Jimmy Carter (1980–81)
Frank Sinatra
David Letterman
Paulie Herman, a New Jersey resident with a squeaky, annoying voice
Doug Whiner

Amy Poehler
Amber, a one-legged contestant on many reality shows
Betty Caruso, co-host of "Bronx Beat"
Nancy Grace
Sharon Osbourne
Dennis Kucinich
Paula Abdul
Sally Needler
Kelly Ripa
Kaitlin
Deidre Nicks, co-host of "The Cougar Den"
Dakota Fanning
Hillary Clinton
Michael Jackson
Kim Jong-il
Katie Couric

Q

Randy Quaid
Rudy Randolph, Jr: a Texas pitchman selling off famous dictators' worldly possessions. Has a son named Rudy Randolph III (played by Robert Downey, Jr.)
Ronald Reagan (1985–86)

Colin Quinn
Joe Blow
Lenny the Lion
Gene the Ex-Con
Rolf, the "Thank You!" guy
Robert De Niro
Host of "Colin Quinn Explains the New York Times"

R

Gilda Radner
Emily Litella
Candy Slice
Bobbi Farber
Colleen Fernman
Jane Herkiman
Connie Carson, host of "Woman To Woman"
Lisa Loopner, of "The Nerds"
Granny, in "The Bel Airabs"
Judy Miller
Roseanne Roseannadanna
Baba Wawa
Lucille Ball

Jeff Richards
Drunk Girl, a perpetually drunk college coed who often appears on Weekend Update
Baby K, a toddler who can rap
Jeff, the constantly pranked roommate from Jarret's Room
Gary Busey
Howard Dean
David Letterman
Bill O'Reilly
Willy Wonka

Rob Riggle
Leviticus, the street prophet
Howard Dean
Larry The Cable Guy
Toby Keith

Ann Risley
Rosalynn Carter

Chris Rock
Nat X
Buster Jenkins
Onski, host of I'm Chillin'
Young Pop, in "Tales From The Barbecue"
Arsenio Hall
Michael Jackson
Luther Campbell

Charles Rocket
Phil Lively
Ronald Reagan (1981)
Host of "The Rocket Report"

Tony Rosato
Ed Asner
Lou Costello
Richard Nixon

Maya Rudolph
Beertje Van Beers, co-host of "Club Traxx"
Beyoncé Knowles
Britanica, singer from Gemini's Twin
Casey, the original assistant in MacGruber
Charli Coffee
Charo
Condoleezza Rice
Diana Ross
Donatella Versace
Jennifer Lopez
Jodi Deitz, co-host of "Bronx Beat"
Kamala Harris
Liza Minnelli
Megan, host of "Wake Up Wakefield!"
Michelle Obama
Nuni Schoener
Oprah Winfrey
Patti Sylviac
Rebecca, host of "Fiesta Politica"
Time Traveling Scott Joplin, host of "Tennis Talk"
Whitney Houston

S

Andy Samberg
Blizzard Man
Shy Ronnie
Out of Breath Jogger, an exhausted runner who dispenses current events from different eras
T'Shane, co-host of Deep House Dish
Mark Wahlberg
Rahm Emanuel
Billy Bob Thornton
Kuato, an infant-sized mutant who lives inside the belly of Danny (a parody from the movie Total Recall)
Cathy
Kevin Federline
Jack Johnson
Admiral Spaceship of Laser Cats
Mark Zuckerberg
Nicolas Cage
Rick Santorum
Liam the teenager who just woke up

Adam Sandler
Opera Man
Cajun Man
Canteen Boy
Audience McGee
Hank Gelfand from Zagat's
Lucy, one of the "Gap Girls"
Pedro, of "Captain Jim and Pedro"
One of the "Two Guys from a Religious Cult" on Weekend Update
Helios, one of the "Hub's Gyros" guys
Fabio, of the "Il Cantore" guys
The Herlihy Boy
Tony Vallencourt, Boston guy
Brian, host of "The Denise Show"
Carlo, one of The Kitchen Boys
Bono
Bill Cosby
Eddie Vedder
Axl Rose
David Brenner
Gary Dell'Abate
Bruce Springsteen

Horatio Sanz
Carol
Mañuel Pantalones on the talk show, ¡Show Biz Grande Explosion!
Ferey Muhtar, host of "The Ferey Muhtar Talk Show"
Goby, the co-host on Jarret's Room
Mr. Banglian, from Wake Up Wakefield!
Frankie from The Boston Teens
Kid Shazzam, co-host of "Rap Street"
Vasquez Gomez-Vasquez
Rick, from Kaitlin & Rick
Elton John
Billy Joel
Ozzy Osbourne
Rosie O'Donnell
Saddam Hussein

Rob Schneider
Richard "Richmeister" Laymer, the "Makin' Copies" guy
Orgasm Guy
Tiny Elvis
Frank, of "Jimmy & Frank, the Doormen"
Tammy from the Donut Hut, in the "Gap Girls" sketches
Carlo, of the "Il Cantore" sketches
The "Put Your Weed In It" guy
The Sensitive Naked Guy
One of the "Hub's Gyros" guys
Elvis Presley
Peter Lorre
k.d. lang
Soon-Yi Previn

Molly Shannon
Mary Katherine Gallagher
Sally O'Malley
Helen Madden
Terri Rialto, co-host of The Delicious Dish
Ann Miller
Courtney Love
Gwen Stefani
Liza Minnelli
Monica Lewinsky
Meredith Vieira
Miss Colleen, co-host of Dog Show
Circe Nightshade, co-host of Goth Talk
Jeannie Darcy

Harry Shearer
Mr. Blackwell
Ronald Reagan (1984)
Mike Wallace
Robin Leach
Gerald, one of the Synchronized Swimmers
Mark Shubb, one of The Folksmen

Martin Short
Ed Grimley, a nerdy Wheel of Fortune fan who plays the triangle and has a goldfish for a pet. This character was originally created for the show SCTV, but wasn't as popular there as it was on SNL. A short-lived cartoon series was made based on this character from 1988-1989.
Jackie Rogers, Jr: an albino entertainer who appears on the sketch The Joe Franklin Show. He hosted the game show parody (on SNL) called Jackie Rogers's $100,000 Jackpot Wad
Lawrence Orback (best known as one of the Synchronized Swimmers)
Nathan Thurm
Irving Cohen
Jerry Lewis
Katharine Hepburn

Sarah Silverman
Cher
Natalie Merchant
Laura Leighton as Sydney Andrews on Melrose Place

Jenny Slate
Tina Tina Chanuse
Hoda Kotb

Robert Smigel
Carl Wollarski, one of Bill Swerski's Superfans
One of the "Hub's Gyros" guys
Caracci's Pizza Chef
Avi, the announcer for "Sabra Shopping Network" and "Sabra Price is Right"
Hank Fielding, with "The Moron's Perspective" on Weekend Update
Dr. Bighead in The Ambiguously Gay Duo

David Spade
Dick Clark's receptionist
Total Bastard Airlines steward (a.k.a. the "Buh-Bye" guy)
Stevie Siskin
Karl, the video store guy
One of the "Two Guys from a Religious Cult" on Weekend Update
Host of "Spade in America with David Spade"
Host of "Hollywood Minute" on Weekend Update
Kato Kaelin
Joan Rivers
Tom Petty
Don Lapre
Christian Slater
Michael J. Fox
Brad Pitt
Owen Wilson
jailed Martha Stewart
Teri Hatcher

Pamela Stephenson
Angela Bradleigh
Billy Idol
Cyndi Lauper

Cecily Strong 

 Cathy Anne on Weekend Update
Melania Trump
 Jeanine Pirro
 Girl you wish you hadn't started a conversation with at a party on Weekend Update

Jason Sudeikis
One of the Two A-Holes
Jeff, the obnoxious boom mic operator
Ed Mahoney
One of the members of "Jon Bovi"
Dane Cook
Billy Ray Cyrus
George W. Bush (2006–08)
Mitt Romney
Todd Palin
Joe Biden
Simon Cowell
Jim Nantz
Wolf Blitzer
Glenn Beck
Robert Osborne
Philip Seymour Hoffman
Rod Blagojevich
Will Schuester
Taylor Hicks
DJ Super Soak
Flip Flop, one of the "Hip Hop Kids"
Phil, "Dysfunctional Holiday Family"
Pete Twinkle, ESPN Color Commentator
Dancer on "What Up With That?"

Julia Sweeney
Pat from "It's Pat!"
Sandy, one of the co-workers in "Makin' Copies!"
Chelsea Clinton
Leslie Abramson
Joan Embery
Jane Pauley
Joy Philbin
Dame Sarah Kensington, a frequent guest on "Theatre Stories"

Terry Sweeney
Nancy Reagan
Joan Collins

T

Kenan Thompson
Al Sharpton
Al Roker
Bill Cosby
Star Jones
Diondre Cole, the host of the BET show "What Up With That?"
DJ Dynasty Handbag from Deep House Dish
Jean K. Jean, a Def Jam Comedian from France who appears on Weekend Update
Reggie, the bandleader on "The Dakota Fanning Show"
Oscar Rogers, the Weekend Update financial consultant
Charles Barkley
Virginiaca Hastings
Googie Rene, owner of "Slightly Stained and Partially Damaged" clothing outlets
Grady Wilson, the "love-making technique" instructional video host
Givindy, from Gays in Space
Kenneth, the stagehand on "The Cougar Den"
K Smoove, one of the "Hip Hop Kids"
Sam, student in the Gilly sketches
Lou, in the Penelope sketches
Reese De'What, host of "Cinema Classics"
Sexy Narrator in the "Eternal Spark of Love" sketches
Marcus, interpreter of deaf comedian Richtie B
Lorenzo Macintosh, a Scared Straight representative whose stories always resemble classic movies
Reba McEntire
David Ortiz
Whoopi Goldberg
Magic Johnson
Steve Harvey
Darnell Hayes, or "Alex Treblack", host of "Black Jeopardy"
Trey, a friend of Stuart's in "The Californians"

V

Danitra Vance
Cabrini Green Jackson, a teenaged mother who dispensed advice on the do's and don'ts of being pregnant.
Latoya Marie (That Black Girl), a struggling actress

Melissa Villaseñor 

 Alexandria Ocasio-Cortez

W

Nancy Walls
Gail Lafferty, a church bazaar attendee always itching for a fight with other attendees (in one episode, she was thrown through a window by an attendee played by Teri Hatcher)
Cindy, the Timelife hotline operator
Susan Taylor, neighbor who's always invited to Frank Henderson's (Will Ferrell) barbecues in the "Get Off The Shed!" sketches
Bobbie Battista
Martha Stewart

Michaela Watkins
Angie Tempura, the "Bitch Pleeze" blogger
Arianna Huffington
Barbara Walters
Hoda Kotb

Damon Wayans
Keith, one of The Stand-Ups
Ned Jones, one of "The Two Jones"

Patrick Weathers
Bob Dylan
Ravi Shankar

Kristen Wiig
The Target Lady
Angela Dixon
The female half of Two A-Holes
Aunt Linda
Jacqueline Seka, co-host of "The Cougar Den"
Penelope, the one-upper
Stacia, the ugly twin
Judy Grimes
Porch Sitter
Jackie Snad
The Crazy McCain Lady
Mindy Elise Grayson
Björk
Judy Garland
Jennifer Tilly
Nancy Pelosi
Madonna
Greta Van Susteren
Gwen Stefani
Jamie Lee Curtis
Kathie Lee Gifford
Elisabeth Hasselbeck
Michele Bachmann
Kate Gosselin
Suze Orman
Lana Del Rey
Virgania Horsen
Vicky St. Elmo, in MacGruber
Dooneese, the deformed singing sister on The Lawrence Welk Show
Kat, of holiday singing duo "Garth & Kat"
Jean, one of "The Introverts"
Sue, a woman who can never contain her excitement at surprise parties
Sexy Shana, the sexy office worker with unsexy behavior
Judith, in the "Dysfunctional Holiday Family"
Gilly, a highly mischievous schoolgirl
Trina, a strange woman who calls everyone "Thomas"
Cheryl Bryant, the overly-excited "Home Giveaway" reporter
Hollywood Dish, as Anastasia Sticks
Drew Barrymore
Diane Sawyer
Paula Deen
Taylor Swift
Kris Jenner
 Triangle Sally

Casey Wilson
Katy Perry
Rachael Ray
Jennifer Aniston
Dusty Velvet, the paralyzed stripper
Toni Ward, co-host of "The Cougar Den"
Nancy, in the "Dysfunctional Holiday Family"
Sam, in the Penelope sketches
Nora, one of the singing sisters on The Lawrence Welk Show

Fred Wolf
Martina Navratilova

Z

Alan Zweibel
Marlon Brando

 
 
Characters
Saturday Night Live
Saturday Night Live
Saturday Night Live